The Altensteig mid-air collision occurred on 11 August 1955 when two United States Air Force Fairchild C-119G Flying Boxcars collided and crashed three miles from Altensteig in West Germany. The aircraft were part of a formation of nine C-119s flying a training mission from Stuttgart-Echterdingen airfield, West Germany with troops from the United States Seventh Army. With all 66 on board both aircraft killed, it was, at the time, the deadliest air crash in Germany.

Accident
Just after 14:00 one of the aircraft on the right of a formation of three developed engine problems just after takeoff, when it was around 4,000 feet; it lost height, then climbed abruptly into the second aircraft, colliding in mid-air. The first aircraft, serial number 53-7841, crashed and disintegrated with the loss of all 19 on board. The second aircraft 53-3222 continued for a while before it also crashed about 30 miles from Stuttgart in a wooded area and burst into flames, killing all 47 on board.

Helicopters were sent to the scene, supported by fire engines and people from local villages to help with the search for survivors, none were found and the fireman were still fighting the blaze into the evening.

Aircraft
The two Fairchild C-119G Flying Boxcars were twin-engined military transport aircraft from the 60th Troop-Carrier Wing based at Rhein-Main airfield in West Germany.

See also 

 1959 Okinawa F-100 crash
 1960 Munich C-131 crash
 1964 Machida F-8 crash
 1977 Yokohama F-4 crash
 1988 Remscheid A-10 crash
 Cavalese cable car disaster (1998)

References
Notes

External links
 AviationSafety Network report

Aviation accidents and incidents in 1955
Aviation accidents and incidents in Germany
Accidents and incidents involving the Fairchild C-119 Flying Boxcar
Mid-air collisions
Mid-air collisions involving military aircraft
Accidents and incidents involving United States Air Force aircraft
1955 in Germany
20th century in Baden-Württemberg
August 1955 events in Europe